MTA Construction and Development Company is a subsidiary of the Metropolitan Transportation Authority (MTA), formed in July 2003 as MTA Capital Construction Company to manage the MTA's major capital projects in the New York metropolitan area. It mainly focuses on improving transportation infrastructure and facilities in New York City, the Hudson Valley, and Long Island areas.  Funding primarily comes from local, state, and national bond sales and budgets. In 2017 Janno Lieber became MTA Capital Construction president; in 2021 he was appointed Acting Chair of the MTA.

Projects being built under MTA Capital Construction include the East Side Access and phases 2, 3, and 4 of the Second Avenue Subway. The Fulton Center was completed in November 2014 under MTA Capital Construction; the 7 Subway Extension was completed in September 2015; and the Second Avenue Subway's first phase was completed in January 2017. Other projects include the third track on the Main Line on the Long Island Rail Road between Floral Park and Mineola, and the second track from Bethpage to Ronkonkoma on the same line.

See also
 New York City Subway

References

External links
 

Organizations established in 2003
Metropolitan Transportation Authority
Proposed public transportation in New York (state)
Proposed public transportation in New York City
2003 establishments in New York City